The Personal Use of Marijuana by Responsible Adults Act of 2008 was a bill in the United States House of Representatives introduced by Barney Frank (D-MA) in the 110th congress on April 17, 2008 as . The bill had a total of 8 cosponsors. It does not change the regulation on the manufacturing or the sale of cannabis. It is the first bill of its kind to be introduced at the federal level in the U.S. since 1984.

The bill incorporates the basic recommendations of the National Commission on Marijuana and Drug Abuse (also known as the Shafer Commission).  The commission published its findings in 1972 and recommended that then-president Richard Nixon decriminalize possession of marijuana in amounts that constituted "simple possession."

The National Organization for the Reform of Marijuana Laws (NORML), the Marijuana Policy Project (MPP), and the Drug Policy Alliance (DPA) had a large hand in the formation of bill, working closely with Rep. Frank. The bill also as mentioned earlier relied heavily also on information and advice from the federally funded National Commission on Marijuana and Drug Abuse.

Rep. Frank says that it's time "for the politicians to catch up with the public on this. The notion that you lock people up for smoking marijuana is pretty silly."

The bill died in committee as it was not passed through the House committee prior to the end of the 110th Congress.  It has been re-introduced in the 111th Congress as H.R. 2943, the Personal Use of Marijuana by Responsible Adults Act of 2009 with ten cosponsors.

Supporters

People
Barney Frank, J.D. (D-MA) U.S. Representative, bill sponsor
Ron Paul, M.D. (R-TX), U.S. Representative, bill cosponsor
Barbara Lee, M.S.W., (D-CA), U.S. Representative
Tammy Baldwin, J.D., (D-WI), U.S. Representative, bill cosponsor
William Lacy Clay, Jr., (D-MO), U.S. Representative
Earl Blumenauer, J.D., (D-OR), U.S. Representative, bill cosponsor
Pete Stark, M.B.A., (D-CA), U.S. Representative, bill cosponsor
Zoe Lofgren, J.D., (D-CA), U.S. Representative, bill cosponsor
Jim McDermott, M.D., (D-WA), U.S. Representative, bill cosponsor

Organizations
Congressional Black Caucus
Drug Policy Alliance (DPA)
Marijuana Policy Project (MPP)
NORML

Opponents
Office of National Drug Control Policy (ONDCP) David Murray

See also
Personal Use of Marijuana by Responsible Adults Act of 2009
Massachusetts Sensible Marijuana Policy Initiative
Adult lifetime cannabis use by country
Annual cannabis use by country
Decriminalization of non-medical marijuana in the United States
Health issues and the effects of cannabis
Illegal drug trade
Legal and medical status of cannabis
Legality of cannabis by country
Removal of cannabis from Schedule I of the Controlled Substances Act
Single Convention on Narcotic Drugs

References

External links
Summary of HR 5843
Cannabisnews.com
"PUMRAA" action page

Ron Paul
Proposed legislation of the 110th United States Congress
Cannabis law in the United States